Oscar Ezequiel Jonathan Parnisari (born 1 June 1990) is an Argentine professional footballer who plays as a centre-back for Instituto.

Career
Parnisari had a youth spell with Estudiantes before joining Olimpo. His senior career with Olimpo began in 2011, his debut arrived in November during a Copa Argentina match with Central Norte. He made eighteen league appearances over his first two seasons, which included his Argentine Primera División bow on 3 December in a draw versus Lanús. On 30 June 2013, Parnisari joined Venezuelan Primera División team Deportivo Anzoátegui on loan. His first appearance came against Independiente del Valle on 1 August, which preceded twenty-seven appearances in all competitions for Deportivo Anzoátegui.

He returned to Olimpo in May 2014 and went on to feature sixty-two times and score one goal, versus Vélez Sarsfield, in four following seasons. On 15 July 2017, Aldosivi of Primera B Nacional signed Parnisari. A year later, Agropecuario captured Parnisari. He scored on his league debut, netting a winner in a win over Santamarina. In January 2022, Parnisari moved to Instituto.

Career statistics
.

Honours
Aldosivi
Primera B Nacional: 2017–18

References

External links

1990 births
Living people
People from San Luis, Argentina
Argentine footballers
Association football defenders
Argentine expatriate footballers
Expatriate footballers in Venezuela
Argentine expatriate sportspeople in Venezuela
Argentine Primera División players
Primera Nacional players
Venezuelan Primera División players
Olimpo footballers
Deportivo Anzoátegui players
Aldosivi footballers
Club Agropecuario Argentino players
Instituto footballers